Gundersen is a surname of Danish and Norwegian origin. Notable people with the surname include:

 Adolf Gundersen (1865–1938), Norwegian-born American physician
 Arnold Gundersen, (born 1949), American nuclear engineer and whistleblower
 Bjørn Gundersen (1924–2002), Norwegian high jumper
 Dag Gundersen (1928–2016), Norwegian linguist and lexicographer
 Einar 'Jeja' Gundersen (1896–1962), Norwegian footballer
 Erik Gundersen (born 1959), Danish speedway rider
 Fridtjof Frank Gundersen (1934–2011), Norwegian law professor and politician for the Progress Party
 Gunder Gundersen (1930–2005), Norwegian Nordic combined skier and sports official
 Gunnar Gundersen (politician) (born 1956), Norwegian politician and Olympic swimmer
 Gunnar Bull Gundersen (1929–1993), Norwegian writer
 Gunnar S. Gundersen (1921–1983), Norwegian modernist painter
 Hans Jørgen G. Gundersen, Danish stereology researcher
 Henry Gundersen, (1920–1945)  Norwegian resistance member 
 Jacob Gundersen, Norwegian Olympic wrestler
Lauren Gunderson (born 1982), American playwright, screenwriter, and short story author
 Mia Gundersen (born 1961), Norwegian singer and actress
 Noah Gundersen (born 1989), singer/songwriter
 Oscar Christian Gundersen (1908–1991), Norwegian politician for the Labour Party, twice Minister for Justice
 Rudolf Gundersen (1879–1946), Norwegian speed skater
 Trude Gundersen (born 1977), Norwegian Olympic medalist in taekwondo

Danish-language surnames
Norwegian-language surnames